The PGP is a paintball pistol originally manufactured by Sheridan. It is a "Stock Class" paintball marker, meaning that it utilizes 12 gram CO2 powerlets, and has a horizontal feed tube that holds 10 rounds.

History

The PGP was a direct development of the earlier bolt-action PG pistol, which was released in 1982. Users often modified their PG's with third-party pump handles to increase their rate of fire. In 1984, Tim McMurray, a design consultant for Sheridan, borrowed $14000 to buy all 200 of Sheridan's unsuccessful K Rifle and modify them for sale through his company, McMurray and Sons. Unbeknownst to McMurray, Sheridan had received a larger offer from another party, and one month later returned his money on which he now owed interest. To stay in business, McMurray innovated the pump handle modification using Delrin pump handles and conversion kits manufactured by Stanley Russell and Earon Carter of South Bay Arms and sold them independently through McMurray and Sons. Shortly thereafter, PMI began marketing their own conversion kits as the "Pursuit Pump Kit." McMurray was not reimbursed for nor credited with the design. 

The earliest PGP's were sold by PMI in 1985. These early models were actually Sheridan PG's which were factory retrofitted with knurled aluminum pump handles. Whether by third-party or factory conversions, these are commonly referred to as "PG conversions" to distinguish them from production PGP models. Soon afterward PMI released the first PGP's which were manufactured from scratch for use with factory pump handles. These first generation PGP's retained the knurled aluminium pump handles from the PG conversions, but featured altered main tube geometry, a smaller diameter bolt, and a locking system consisting of a spring and ball bearings mounted within the bolt to prevent bolt rebound during firing. The knurled aluminum handle was eventually replaced with a ribbed aluminum handle, and the faux-wood brown plastic grips were replaced with black plastic versions. A short time before the 1994 Crosman buyout of Sheridan, the ribbed aluminum handles were replaced with black ribbed Delrin pump handles. 

Crosman-era PGP's standardized on plastic pump handles, no rear sight, a notched CO2 plug to aid removal by the use of a coin or other implement, and more warnings and information stamped on the brass body. These were designated "P-series" PGP's. The final old-pattern PGP's were the "PA-series" PGPs, which featured the newer cartridge-style valve. 

In 2001, the old-pattern PGP's were replaced by the new-pattern PGP's. While the included manuals still referred to these guns as "Model PGP," the parts list refers to them as a PGP2, and that they began manufacture in February 2001. Thus, this model has interchangeably been referred to as the PGP2001, PGP2k1, PGP2k, or PGP2, and although technically it retains the original PGP designation, usually one of the former is used for clarity when referring to a new-pattern PGP.

PGP bodies and frames were often manufactured and stockpiled for years before final assembly. Therefore, it is not uncommon to see final-generation PA series guns with rear sights, indicating that the bodies were manufactured almost a decade earlier. Lack of available internal PMI and Crosman documentation means that individual models can be difficult to date.

Operation

The PGP uses a Sheridan-type valve design which it shares with other Sheridan models such as the P68 and Piranha. It is also referred to as a "stacked-tube valve" in contrast with the popular Nelson-based "inline valve." This basic format developed into a semi-automatic valve design with the Sheridan VM68 and is the basis for the popular Spyder series of markers.

The PGP design consists of three stacked brass tubes which are soldered together in parallel. The bottom tube contains the valve assembly and the 12 gram CO2 cartridge which powers the gun. The center tube contains the bolt and the barrel. The top tube is the feed tube, with a capacity of 10 paintballs. A 12 gram CO2 cartridge is inserted into the front of the bottom tube and secured with the threaded CO2 changer. Unlike most later designs, the 12 gram is not pierced by the piercing pin when the 12 gram CO2 changer is turned into position. Instead, the user must pump the gun and fire once to propel the piercing pin into the 12 gram and provide CO2 to the gun. Since this "piercing shot" provides no CO2 to the valve, many players developed the habit of deliberately inverting the gun to prevent a paintball from being loaded during this step as a measure against double feeding. Once the cartridge is pierced, the valve assembly is pressurized with CO2. The gun is pumped once more and is ready to fire.

Actuating the pump handle moves the bolt rearwards to load a paintball, and cocks the hammer. The pump handle is returned to the forward position, moving the paintball into the chamber. Pressing the trigger lowers a sear which drops the hammer onto the spring-loaded valve, releasing CO2 in proportion to mainspring and valve spring pressure. CO2 is released from the valve body and finally from the lower tube to the center tube via a vertical slot, where it propels the paintball forward. The hammer returns to its original position and the process is repeated.

The Sheridan valve design differs from the Nelson-style inline valve in that no CO2 passes through the bolt, instead passing from the valve body straight to the chamber. The bolt's primary purpose is to cock the hammer and facilitate feeding. When the pressurized CO2 gas enters the low-pressure center tube, it exerts force on the bolt as well as the paintball, creating a tendency for the bolt to rebound from its fully closed position. In the process, some of the energy used to accelerate the paintball is lost by accelerating the bolt instead, resulting in a loss of velocity. Holding the pump handle forward with one hand can prevent bolt bounce but also prevents one-handed shooting. As a remedy, the PGP bolt uses a spring and a pair of 1/4" ball bearings which lock into holes drilled in the frame, increasing the force required for both the user and CO2 impulse to open the bolt.

Since paintballs feed into the chamber from the rear of the feed tube, it is standard practice to "rock" the gun with the muzzle pointing upwards while pumping to ensure proper feeding. Efficiency is dependent on ball-to-bore fit, velocity, temperature, and even the manufacturing inconsistencies of 12 grams, but approximately 20 paintballs per 12 gram at full velocity is standard. Optimal conditions can produce upwards of 30, and those with modified bolt and valve assemblies can achieve 35-40 shots per 12 gram.

Design

There are two main versions of the PGP. The newer PGP2 pattern has several upgrades over the original.

The old-pattern PGP is made of three tubes of soldered brass, powdercoated black. A trigger frame is attached to the bottom tube by two screws, and the feed caps are also secured by an o-ring and a twist lock. It has no external velocity adjuster, so the gun must be taken apart to adjust it, either by cutting the spring or adding shims. P-series PGP's have the old style valve which requires a Sheridan valve tool for disassembly, while PA-series guns feature the "cartridge valve" design for easier disassembly and adjustment. All have a barrel length of 6 inches.

As a variant of the PG, one of first commercially available paintball markers, the original PGP variants had a number of deficiencies which became apparent as the popularity of paintball boomed and the pace of the game increased. The CO2 changer was small, difficult to grip, easily dropped or lost, and was very finely threaded, requiring six full turns for removal and six more for reloading. Changing 12 grams in-game was a perilous exercise as the user was left essentially unarmed while they completed this long process and finally fired an extra shot to pierce the 12 gram. Larger, knurled knobs became available on the aftermarket, making the CO2 changer much easier to handle. Later, quick changer add-ons reduced the number of turns required from six to one, greatly improving the speed of the 12 gram change. The feed tube cap was not captive and a piece of string, wire, or shoelace was often threaded through the rear of the cap for retention purposes. Many owners drilled the rear tube for an external velocity adjuster.

Recognizing the shortcomings in the design the original PGP, Sheridan's PGP2 featured many improved versions of the home-brew modifications that owners made to their old-pattern PGP's. The PGP2 has an external velocity adjuster, a CO2] quick changer, a longer barrel, fiber-optic sights, and a plastic feed cap that allows for quicker reloading time. However, the feed cap is made of brittle plastic and it is commonly lost or broken. The quick changer allows for faster CO2 changes than the old pattern. The longer barrel, besides improving accuracy, helps prevent users from placing their hand or fingers in front of the muzzle while changing 12 grams.

References

Paintball markers